Vernoye is a rural locality (a selo) in Ukrainsky Selsoviet of Seryshevsky District, Amur Oblast, Russia. The population was 129 as of 2018. There are 2 streets.

Geography 
Vernoye is located 27 km northeast of Seryshevo (the district's administrative centre) by road. Sosnovka is the nearest rural locality.

References 

Rural localities in Seryshevsky District